The Devil May Cry anime series is directed by Shin Itagaki and produced by Madhouse. The English adaptation of the anime has been licensed by Funimation Entertainment. They are based on the Devil May Cry video game series produced by Capcom. The background of the storyline is primarily based on the first and third installments of the series, Devil May Cry and Devil May Cry 3: Dante's Awakening respectively. The series follows the daily life of demon hunter Dante as he adopts a young girl named Patty Lowell and faces off against a demon seeking to attain godhood.

The anime was originally announced at the Tokyo Game Show on September 22, 2006, with plans to release twelve episodes of the series. Unlike most anime, the episode titles were released in English instead of the customary Japanese. The first episode aired on June 14, 2007, with the twelfth shown on September 6, 2007. The episodes aired on WOWOW. On June 30, 2007, at Anime Expo 07, it was announced that ADV Films had licensed the show. However, in 2008, it became one of more than 30 titles that were transferred to Funimation. The series made its North American television debut on the Funimation Channel in September 2010 and it began airing on Chiller's Anime Wednesdays block on July 15, 2015.

Two pieces of theme music are used for the episodes, one opening theme and one closing theme. The opening theme is "d.m.c." by rungran, and the closing theme is "I'll be your home" by Rin Oikawa. The original soundtrack for the episodes was released by Media Factory on August 18, 2007.

Six DVD compilations have been released by Media Factory, each containing two episodes of the anime, with the latest one released on November 22, 2007. A special edition of the first compilation is packaged with Devil May Cry 4. An original soundtrack and a drama CD centered around Dante's ally Trish have also been released. A blu-ray disc was released on July 27, 2009.


Episode list

Home media
Japanese

English

Notes

References
General

 

Specific

External links
  
 WOWOW's webpage for the Devil May Cry anime 

Devil May Cry
Devil May Cry